The term deciduous refers to a biological process of losing or dropping appendages of the organism.

Specifically, the term may refer to:
deciduous trees, plants which shed their leaves regularly
deciduous teeth (milk teeth, baby teeth), that fall out during the course of normal development
other body parts that are shed, such as antlers, are also described as deciduous
Decidua